Alloclita gambiella is a moth in the family Cosmopterigidae. It was described by Walsingham in 1891. It is found in Gambia and Yemen.

References

Natural History Museum Lepidoptera generic names catalog

Moths described in 1891
Antequerinae
Moths of Africa
Moths of Asia